The 1951–52 DDR-Oberliga was the third season of the DDR-Oberliga, the first tier of league football in East Germany.

The league was contested by 19 teams and BSG Turbine Halle won the championship, the club's second one after 1949.

Rudolf Krause of BSG Chemie Leipzig and Kurt Weißenfels of Lokomotive Stendal were the league's joint top scorer with 27 goals each. The season also saw the most goals ever scored in the history of the Oberliga with 1,233, 55 goals more than the previous one.

The 1951–52 season saw the highest spectator number of any DDR-Oberliga season with a total of 3,620,000, in line with the record number of season games played, 342.

Table
The 1951–52 season saw two newly promoted clubs, Wismut Aue and Motor Wismar while SV VP Vorwärts Leipzig was newly formed and admitted to the league. SV VP Vorwärts Leipzig would change its name to SV Vorwärts der HVA Leipzig later in the season.

Results

References

Sources

External links
 Das Deutsche Fussball Archiv  Historic German league tables

1951-52
Ober
1951–52 in East German football